Rudolph Blankenburg (February 16, 1843 – April 12, 1918) was an American businessman and manufacturer, who became a politician and elected mayor of Philadelphia, leading a reform administration from 1911 to 1916.

Biography
Blankenburg was born in Barntrup, Lippe, Germany. From age 7 to 14, he was tutored by Carl Becker, a graduate of the Free University of Berlin. He showed an aptitude for languages, and became proficient in English and French, in addition to German. At the age of fourteen he left home to spend three years studying at the Real Gymnasium at Lippstadt.

In 1865, Blankenburg followed Becker to America. He began working as a salesman and then became a textile manufacturer. He also began associating with the Society of Friends. He became wealthy and retired from his business concerns in 1909.

Blankenburg became a naturalized U.S. citizen.

On April 18, 1867, Blankenburg married Lucretia Longshore (8 May 1845 – 29 March 1937), a Quaker suffragist, social activist, civic reformer, and writer. Longshore was the daughter of pioneering physician Hannah E. Longshore, who died on October 19, 1901, at the Blankenburgs' home at 214 Logan Square. The street on which that address was located, West Logan Square, ceased to exist when Logan Square was extended westward in the creation of the Benjamin Franklin Parkway.

He began taking an interest in civic improvement and reform politics in Philadelphia in 1877. He was elected county commissioner for Philadelphia in 1905, serving 1906–1909. He was then elected mayor of Philadelphia in 1911 on the Keystone-Democratic ticket; the coalition was organized to fight Republican corruption in the state and city. He served as mayor from December 1911 to January 1916.

Because of his commitment to progressive reform, he was known as "The Old War Horse of Reform" and "The Old Dutch Cleanser" (a play on a cleaning product brand). He ended assessments by ward leaders of policemen, reorganized the civil service system to have it based on merit, gained passage by the legislature of a bill to enable the city to lease development of subway and transit lines, and worked for reform for 40 years as a political activist.

In earlier years he was a worldwide traveler. He also became known by his numerous magazine and newspaper articles on social, economic and religious questions.

Blankenburg died in the Germantown section of Philadelphia. In accordance with his wishes, his body was cremated and his ashes buried at Fair Hill Burial Ground alongside the bodies of his three children.

Legacy

More than 6000 people viewed Blankenburg's body and attended his funeral, held at the Arch Street Methodist Church.

In 1921 the City of Philadelphia contracted with the John W. Sullivan Company of New York for the construction of a 129-foot, steam-powered, all-steel fireboat to be named the Rudolph Blankenburg. The boat was launched in Elizabeth, New Jersey on August 10 of that year, sponsored by Blankenburg's widow, Lucretia, who broke a bottle of Champagne across its bow. The fireboat remained in service until 1950. That year, the Blankenburg and its running mate, the J. Hampton Moore (which was named after another mayor of Philadelphia), were replaced by a pair of diesel-powered fireboats, the Franklin and the Delaware.

The Rudolph Blankenburg Elementary School in Philadelphia was built in the 1920s.

References

Further reading
 
 Lucretia Longshore Blankenburg, The Blankenburgs of Philadelphia, 1928

1843 births
1918 deaths
19th-century American businesspeople
19th-century American politicians
American Quakers
German emigrants to the United States
Mayors of Philadelphia
People from Lippe
Philadelphia City Commissioners